Transcription factor IIIB 90 kDa subunit is a protein that in humans is encoded by the BRF1 gene.

Function 

This gene encodes one of the three subunits of the RNA polymerase III transcription factor complex. This complex plays a central role in transcription initiation by RNA polymerase III on genes encoding tRNA, 5S rRNA, and other small structural RNAs. The gene product belongs to the TF2B family. Three alternatively spliced variants encoding three different isoforms, that function at different promoters transcribed by RNA polymerase III, have been identified. A transcript encoding a fourth isoform has not yet been completely characterized.

Interactions
BRF1 (gene) has been shown to interact with:
 RB1,
 RBL1, 
 RBL2,  and
 TBP

References

Further reading

External links